The United Shire of Beechworth was a local government area about  northeast of Melbourne, the state capital of Victoria, Australia.

History

Beechworth United Shire originated as two separate entities: the Borough of Beechworth, first created as a municipal district on 23 August 1856, becoming a borough on 11 September 1863, and the Shire of Beechworth, created on 27 December 1865 as a union of the Stanley (10 December 1862) and Wooragee (30 March 1863) Road Districts. The two entities merged on 29 December 1871, to form the United Shire of Beechworth. At its dissolution, it was the only local government entity remaining in Victoria which was styled as a 'United Shire', although many others were also the results of amalgamations.

On 18 November 1994, the United Shire of Beechworth was abolished, and along with parts of the Shires of Chiltern, Rutherglen and Yackandandah, was merged into the newly created Shire of Indigo. The area around Mudgegonga, in the southeast of the former United Shire, was transferred to the newly created Alpine Shire.

Wards

The United Shire of Beechworth was divided into four ridings, each of which elected three councillors:
 East Central Riding
 West Central Riding
 North Riding
 South Riding

Towns and localities
 Baarmutha
 Beechworth*
 Bowman
 Brookfield
 Everton
 Gapsted
 Murmungee
 Reids Creek
 Silver Creek
 Stanley
 Woolshed
 Wooragee

* Council seat.

Population

* Estimate in the 1958 Victorian Year Book.

References

External links
 Victorian Places - Beechworth Shire

Beechworth
1856 establishments in Australia